Virginia's 44th House of Delegates district elects one of 100 seats in the Virginia House of Delegates, the lower house of the state's bicameral legislature. District 44 represents part of Fairfax County. The seat is currently held by Democrat Paul Krizek.

Geography
District 44, representing part of Fairfax County, is located in Virginia's 8th Congressional District.

Elections
Incumbent Democrat Paul Krizek first took office in 2016, after winning an uncontested general election in November 2015. He was re-elected in 2017, again without facing an opponent. In November 2019, Krizek was challenged by Republican Richard Hayden. Krizek won the contest with 70.67% of the vote.

References

Government in Fairfax County, Virginia
Virginia House of Delegates districts